Timberland Regional Library (TRL) is a public library system serving the residents of western Washington state, United States including Grays Harbor, Lewis, Mason, Pacific, and Thurston counties. Timberland Regional Library has 27 community libraries, 2 cooperative library centers, and 3 library kiosks. It was founded in 1968, following a four-year demonstration project, and is funded through property taxes and timber taxes.

History
A two-year demonstration library system, the Timberland Library Demonstration (TLD), was established in 1964 to serve Grays Harbor, Lewis, Mason, Pacific, and Thurston counties, using $310,000 in funds from the federal Library Services and Construction Act and local sources. Each of the counties had cities with independent library systems and several rural library districts, including the Grays Harbor County Rural Library District and South Puget Sound Regional Library, who chose to either join or opt out of the demonstration project. The Timberland Library Demonstration relied on the Washington State Library to process its books, which were also stored in municipal libraries. The system debuted its bookmobile in September 1964, based in Centralia and traveling on ten routes between rural areas in all five counties. The formation of a permanent library district would require a public vote, which was pushed back from 1966 to 1968, waiting for a more favorable general election. The South Puget Sound Regional Library, which comprised Mason and Thurston counties, threatened to leave the demonstration later in 1966 over the effectiveness of the program for their counties. After months of negotiation, the two counties reversed their decision, allowing the demonstration project to continue for another two years.

On November 5, 1968, residents of unincorporated areas in the five counties approved the establishment of an intercounty rural library district, with four counties having large margins in favor of the library. The Timberland Regional Library became the state's third intercounty district, following the North Central Regional Library in northeastern Washington and the Sno-Isle Regional Library in the northern Puget Sound area. The new library formed its board the following month and opened its headquarters at the 1914 Carnegie library in Olympia.

2009 failed ballot measure
On February 3, 2009, approximately 53% of voters within TRL's five-county district turned down "Levy Lid Lift Proposition 1" in a special election.  This proposition would have lifted the 34.5-cent (per thousand dollars of assessed valuation) cap on TRL's property tax levy rate.  As a result, the Library Board determined that approximately 2.5 million dollars would need to be cut from TRL's 2010 budget.

Branches
The Timberland Regional Library system has 27 community libraries and four kiosks serving most cities in its five-county area. The cities of Mossyrock, Napavine, Ocean Shores, Pe Ell, and Vader are not part of the library's district. TRL also offers access to information services via online reference databases, library catalog, toll-free telephone 6 days a week as well as many other resources 24 hours a day 7 days a week. Ebooks and digital audiobooks, provided by the digital distributor OverDrive, can be downloaded from the library's website. 

Aberdeen
Amanda Park
Belfair (North Mason)
Centralia
Chehalis
Elma
Hoodsport
Hoquiam
Ilwaco
Lacey
McCleary
Montesano
Morton (kiosk only)
Naselle
Nisqually Tribal Library (kiosk only)
Oakville
Ocean Park
Olympia
Packwood
Rainier (book drop only)
Randle (Mountain View)
Raymond
Rochester (kiosk only)
Salkum
Shelton
South Bend
South Puget Sound Community College, Hawks Prairie campus (kiosk only)
Tenino
Tokeland (Shoalwater Bay Tribal Community Library)
Toledo (kiosk only)
Tumwater
Westport
Winlock
Yelm

Zine collection
The Olympia branch has a special collection of zines, many created by local authors. There were over 2,000 zines in the collection .

Reciprocal library systems
TRL participates in reciprocal borrowing agreements with the following public library systems in Washington State. Under this program, TRL cardholders can obtain free accounts at these library systems, and vice versa.
Fort Vancouver Regional Library District (Clark, Klickitat, Skamania Counties)
King County Library System
Kitsap Regional Library
Longview Public Library
North Central Regional Library (Okanogan, Chelan, Douglas, Ferry, Grant Counties)
North Olympic Library System (Clallam County)
Pierce County Library
Seattle Public Library
Sno-Isle Regional Library System (Snohomish, Island Counties)
Whatcom County Library System

References

External links
Timberland Regional Library

County library systems in Washington (state)
Education in Grays Harbor County, Washington
Education in Lewis County, Washington
Education in Mason County, Washington
Pacific County, Washington
Education in Thurston County, Washington
Government agencies established in 1968